Robert Sherwood may refer to:

Robert E. Sherwood (1896–1955), American playwright, editor, and biographer and speechwriter for President Franklin D. Roosevelt.
Robert Edmund Sherwood (1864–1946), American clown and author
Bobby Sherwood (1914–1981), American bandleader
Robert Sherwood (horseman) (1835–1894), British jockey and horse trainer
Robert M. Sherwood (1936–2016), American seascape artist